Deen You Know is the debut studio album by American hip hop group Native Deen, released in April 2005 by Jamal Records.

Composition and release
Deen You Know was released in April 2005. It conveys the message of Islam in a contemporary style. The songs have a social and moral message to inspire others.

The group adopted a musically thin texture. Although a few of tracks incorporate xylophone, most of the songs rely solely on drums and vocal harmonization. The drums are often pitched to add a melodic quality. The album features themes of encouraging good deeds, importance having good intentions, virtues of seeking repentance, the life of the Islamic prophets, preparations for the hereafter, hardships of life, negative effects of intoxicants and the blessings of Allah.

Track listing

References

External links

2005 debut albums
Native Deen albums
Arabic-language albums